Kentaro Tsuruoka (born 26 August 1974) is a Japanese snowboarder. He competed in the men's parallel giant slalom event at the 2006 Winter Olympics.

References

1974 births
Living people
Japanese male snowboarders
Olympic snowboarders of Japan
Snowboarders at the 2006 Winter Olympics
People from Chiba (city)
Asian Games medalists in snowboarding
Snowboarders at the 2003 Asian Winter Games
Asian Games bronze medalists for Japan
Medalists at the 2003 Asian Winter Games
21st-century Japanese people